Olov Grøtting (born 14 September 1960) is a Norwegian politician for the Centre Party.

She was born in Alvdal as a daughter of farmers. After finishing her secondary education in Tynset in 1979, she worked in tourism, and also studied at Hedmark University College. After a hiatus from higher education she took the master's degree in public administration at the University of Karlstad in 2004.

Grøtting was elected to Alvdal municipal council in 1999, served four years, and later returned in 2007 to serve as mayor until 2011. In 2009 she also became deputy leader of Hedmark Centre Party.

She served as a deputy representative to the Parliament of Norway from Hedmark during the terms 2009–2013 and 2013–2017. She became a full member of Parliament in 2012, when Trygve Slagsvold Vedum was appointed to cabinet. She remained such until the cabinet where Vedum was a member, Stoltenberg's Second Cabinet lost office in October 2013.

References

1960 births
Living people
People from Alvdal
Hedmark University College alumni
Karlstad University alumni
Members of the Storting
Centre Party (Norway) politicians
Mayors of places in Hedmark
Women mayors of places in Norway
20th-century Norwegian women politicians
20th-century Norwegian politicians
21st-century Norwegian politicians
21st-century Norwegian women politicians
Women members of the Storting